Barry Quentin Word (born July 17, 1964) is a former American football running back for the National Football League.

College
Word played college football at the University of Virginia. In 1985, he ran for 1224 yards, which is currently the fifth most rushing yards total put up by a Virginia Cavaliers running back. Also in 1985, Word was the Atlantic Coast Conference player of the year.

NFL career

Barry Word was drafted in the 3rd round, 62nd overall, by the New Orleans Saints in the 1986 NFL Draft. Shortly after being drafted, he and two other Virginia athletes were indicted on cocaine distribution charges. The Saints did not offer a contact to Word after his indictment but retained his football rights. Word pleaded guilty, but his willingness to cooperate and his limited involvement in the case meant he only received 5 months in prison. After Word’s release from prison in March 1987, he signed a three-year contract with the Saints and ran for 133 yards as a halfback in his rookie year. In 1988, however, he fell to third-string running back for the Saints behind Rueben Mayes and Dalton Hilliard, two running backs drafted by the Saints the prior year. Unhappy with being shifted from running back to halfback, Word walked away from the Saints after two games in 1988. He then had unsuccessful attempts to join the Dallas Cowboys later in 1988 and with the Pittsburgh Steelers in 1989. He was finally signed by the Kansas City Chiefs before the start of the 1990 season.

Word had a career year in 1990, rushing for 1015 yards on 204 carries, garnering NFL Comeback Player of the Year Award for his performance. He split carries with Christian Okoye during the 1990 season as well as the next two years. At the start of the 1994 season Word was traded to the Minnesota Vikings and he ran for 847 yards on 142 carries. He was signed by the Cardinals at the start of the 1994 season, but only played one game for them and did not have a rushing attempt. This was to be the last time he took the field in the NFL as he retired after the game. He has said that being able to retire early is not a bad thing, and said as much to Tiki Barber when Barber was set to retire concluding the 2006 season.

Personal life
He now lives in Haymarket, Virginia and owns SpeedPro Imaging of Centreville, a wide-formating printing company.

References

1964 births
Living people
American football running backs
Arizona Cardinals players
Kansas City Chiefs players
Minnesota Vikings players
New Orleans Saints players
Virginia Cavaliers football players
People from Pittsylvania County, Virginia
People from South Boston, Virginia
Players of American football from Virginia
People from Haymarket, Virginia